The 1962 Minnesota Twins improved to 91–71, finishing second in the American League, five games short of the World Champion New York Yankees. 1,433,116 fans attended Twins games, the second highest total in the American League.

Offseason 
 November 27, 1961: Georges Maranda was drafted by the Twins from the San Francisco Giants in the 1961 rule 5 draft.
 Prior to the 1962 Season: Joe Foy was signed by the Minnesota Twins as an amateur free agent.

Regular season 
Statistically, many members of the Twins had seasons in which they led the American League. Harmon Killebrew hit 48 home runs and drove in 126, leading the AL in both categories. Bob Allison hit 29 home runs, drove in 102 runs, and led the Twins in runs scored with 102. Camilo Pascual became the Twins' first 20-game winner and led the AL with 206 strikeouts.

On July 18, at Metropolitan Stadium in Bloomington, Minnesota, two Twins made major league history by hitting grand slam home runs in the same inning.  In the first inning -- off Cleveland Indians pitcher Barry Latman -- Bob Allison homered to clear the loaded bases.  Indians pitcher Jim Perry subsequently replaced Latman, and Harmon Killebrew greeted him by driving in Bill Tuttle, Vic Power and Rich Rollins.  Minnesota scored eleven runs in their half of the first inning.

Four Twins made the All-Star Game. The selections were third baseman Rich Rollins, catcher Earl Battey and pitchers Jim Kaat and Camilo Pascual.

On August 26, Jack Kralick threw the first no-hitter in Minnesota Twins history. The Twins beat the Kansas City Athletics by a score of 1–0.

First baseman Vic Power won his fifth Gold Glove, catcher Earl Battey won his third, and Jim Kaat won his first.

Season standings

Record vs. opponents

Notable transactions 
 April 2, 1962: Pedro Ramos was traded by the Twins to the Cleveland Indians for Vic Power and Dick Stigman.
 April 3, 1962: Billy Martin was released by the Twins.
 August 20, 1962: Jackie Collum, a player to be named later and cash were traded by the Twins to the Cleveland Indians for Rubén Gómez. The Twins completed the deal by sending Georges Maranda to the Indians on October 9.

Roster

Player stats

Batting

Starters by position 
Note: Pos = Position; G = Games played; AB = At bats; H = Hits; Avg. = Batting average; HR = Home runs; RBI = Runs batted in

Other batters 
Note: G = Games played; AB = At bats; H = Hits; Avg. = Batting average; HR = Home runs; RBI = Runs batted in

Pitching

Starting pitchers 
Note: G = Games pitched; IP = Innings pitched; W = Wins; L = Losses; ERA = Earned run average; SO = Strikeouts

Other pitchers 
Note: G = Games pitched; IP = Innings pitched; W = Wins; L = Losses; ERA = Earned run average; SO = Strikeouts

Relief pitchers 
Note: G = Games pitched; W = Wins; L = Losses; SV = Saves; ERA = Earned run average; SO = Strikeouts

Farm system

References

External links 
Player stats from www.baseball-reference.com
Team info from www.baseball-almanac.com

 

Minnesota Twins seasons
Minnesota Twins season
1962 in sports in Minnesota